Ellis George Perks (born 18 March 1997) is a British speedway rider. He is the great nephew of former rider Dave Perks and son of former referee Robbie Perks. In 2019, he became the first ever rider to win all three tiers of the British Speedway leagues in the same season; the Premiership, Championship and National League.

Career
Born in Worcester, England, Perks began riding grasstrack at the age of 6 and took up speedway aged 10 after moving to Australia with his family in 2007.

He made his British speedway league debut in 2014 with Scunthorpe Scorpions' National League team, and was signed by Poole Pirates as a club asset in 2015, riding that year in the Premier League for Scorpions and in the National League for Cradley Heathens and Eastbourne Eagles, and in 2016 for Plymouth Devils and Isle of Wight Warriors. 

At the beginning of the 2017 season Perks signed for the Rye House Rockets. He also rode that season for Wolverhampton Wolves, Redcar Bears, and Buxton Hitmen. After failing to get a team place at the start of the 2018 season, he was signed by Peterborough Panthers in June as a short-term replacement for Emil Grondal, and in July returned to the Heathens team for their National Trophy campaign.

In December 2018 he signed to ride for Leicester Lions in the SGB Championship and Leicester Lion Cubs in the National League for the 2019 season. He also signed for Swindon Robins in the SGB Premiership. He went on to win all three leagues with these teams in 2019, the first ever rider to achieve this. He also won the SGB Premiership Supporters Cup with the Robins, the Championship Shield with the Lions and National League Knockout Cup with the Lion Cubs in the same year.

References 

1997 births
Living people
British speedway riders
Plymouth Devils riders
Redcar Bears riders